Mumeng Rural LLG is a local-level government (LLG) of Morobe Province, Papua New Guinea.

Wards
10. Timini
11. Hengambu
12. Gurakor
13. Patep
14. Parakris
15. Yanta
16. Zenag
17. Kumalu
18. Sambio
19. Latukatop
20. Baiyune
21. Galawo
22. Dambi
23. Mumeng Station
24. Witipos
25. Kapin
26. Tayek
27. Bupu
28. Piu
29. Dangal

References

Local-level governments of Morobe Province